Ammavin Kaipesi is a 2012 Tamil-language drama film directed and cinematographed by Thangar Bachchan. Shanthnoo Bhagyaraj, Iniya form the cast. Director Thangar Bachan who gave the most memorable films like Azhagi, Solla Marandha Kadhai, Pallikoodam and Onbadhu Roobai Nottu, is coming with a new directorial and production venture Ammavin Kaipesi.

The film is based on a novel of the same name written by the Director. Shanthanu and Iniya play the lead role while Thangar Bachan plays a pivotal role. Ammavin Kaipesi was among 2012 Deepavali releases and was released along with Podaa Podi and Thuppakki receiving mixed to positive reviews.

Plot
The story is woven around a mobile phone, which Thankar says connects people by voice and helps to have new relationships and maintain them. A mother has nine children, but she lives in a situation, which separates her from the children. The only way she could be in touch with them and hear their voices is a mobile phone. She regards her mobile phone as the representative of her children and has become possessive of it.

Cast
Shanthnu Bhagyaraj as Annamalai
Iniya as Selvi
 A. Revathy as Ranganayaki
Thangar Bachan as Prasad
Meenal as Kanaga
Nagineedu as Chittibabu
Azhagam Perumal as Chinnapillai
Thambi Chozhan
NSK. Senthil Kumar as Maatheswaran

Production
Thankar Bachan is back after a hiatus. Post his Onbadhu Roobai Nottu, he is all set to release his next drama, Ammavin Kaipesi. Starring Shanthnoo Bhagyaraj and Iniya in leading roles, this film is said to be about an abandoned mother.
Thankar Bachan has produced the film and handled the camera himself, Rohit Kulkarni has composed the music and Kishore Te has edited the film.

Thankar Bachan has also said that people who have abandoned their parents would feel terribly bad after watching the film. The film went on floor 15 July 2012. Ammavin Kaipesi released on 13 November 2012

Reception
The movie released on 13 November 2012 to mixed reviews. MovieCrow called it outdated and overdramatic and rated it 1.5 out of 5. Pavithra Srinivasan of Rediff gave 2.5 out of 5 saying that "Even though its heart is in the right place, too much melodrama brings Tamil film Ammavin Kaipesi down." IBNLive rated it 3 out of 5 saying, This film bleed mothers sentiments. Behindwoods rated 2.25 out of 5 saying, For audience who patronize, Thankar's work, Ammavin Kaipesi does not disappoint. For the mainstream entertainment expecting populace, AK will prove to be a different experience.

Soundtrack

Film score and soundtrack of Ammavin Kaipesi are composed by Rohit Kulkarni who earlier composed music for Porkkalam. Audio was released in Satyam Cinemas Chennai on 1 October 2012 and was released by many famous actors of Tamil Cinema. The song 'Enna Senji Pora' was shown in the trailer and got good response.

References

External links
 

2012 films
Indian drama films
2010s Tamil-language films
Films based on Indian novels
Films directed by Thangar Bachan
2012 drama films